SES S.A. is a Luxembourgish satellite telecommunications network provider supplying video and data connectivity worldwide to broadcasters, content and internet service providers, mobile and fixed network operators, governments and institutions.

SES is one of the world's leading satellite owners and operators with over 70 satellites in two different orbits, geostationary orbit (GEO) and medium Earth orbit (MEO). These include the well-known European Astra TV satellites, the O3b and O3b mPOWER data satellites and others with names including AMC, Ciel, NSS, Quetzsat, YahSat and SES.

Based in Betzdorf, Luxembourg and founded in 1985 as Société Européenne des Satellites, the company was renamed SES Global in 2001 and has been simply "SES" since 2006. The company's stock is listed on the Luxembourg Stock Exchange and Euronext Paris with ticker symbol SESG and is a component of the LuxX, CAC Next 20 and Euronext 100 stock market indexes.

A book, High Above, telling the story of the founding of SES and the development of its first Astra satellites was published in 2010 to mark the company's 25th Anniversary, and was followed by Even Higher in 2012 and Beyond Frontiers in 2016.

Business and services 
SES provides services through two business units, SES Video and SES Networks, for video-centric and data-centric markets, respectively.

SES Video 
(52% of revenue)SES Video's business comprises video distribution and video services. Video distribution delivers video content via Direct-to-Home, Direct-to-Cable and Internet Protocol television (IPTV) platforms, and includes wholly owned subsidiary HD+, the direct-to-consumer high-definition digital satellite TV platform in Germany. Video services encompasses technical ground services, such as content management, playout, encryption, satellite uplinks and interactive services, to broadcasters worldwide.

SES has been a major player in the development of the direct-to-home market in Europe and the cable TV and Direct-broadcast satellite (DBS) markets in the United States. SES satellites transmit a variety of digital formats from radio to Ultra High Definition TV (UHDTV) and the company has been instrumental in defining technical standards for broadcast and interactive media.

At the end of 2021, SES satellites carried over 8400 TV channels, including 3130 HD and UHD channels, to more than 1 billion people in 366 million homes globally, or regionally as follows:

In March 2022, SES reported that the breakdown of revenue to SES Video by different sectors was as follows:

SES Networks 
(48% of revenue)SES Networks provides managed connectivity services to customers in markets including telecommunications, Cloud computing, commercial air and shipping, holiday cruises, energy, mining, and government and institutional areas, with end users of the technology including internet users in remote regions, air and at sea travellers, windfarms, mines, defence and humanitarian missions.

SES Networks includes the O3b satellites (originally owned and operated by O3b Networks), GovSat (a public-private partnership with 50% SES participation) and SES subsidiary, SES Space & Defense (previously, SES Government Solutions).

Services include capacity-on-demand, and mobile backhaul solutions anywhere on the planet for telcos and Mobile Network Operators, reliable network connections for mining and energy companies in remote occasions, and critical connectivity that is rapidly deployable, even in challenging and remote situations, for 62 government defence, civil, and humanitarian operations in 28 countries.

SES Networks delivers broadband connectivity for maritime vessels in any body of water or port in the world and in-flight services to aircraft ranging from secure cockpit communications to passenger connectivity and entertainment, through providers such as Global Eagle Entertainment, Gogo, Thales and Panasonic Avionics.

Using medium Earth orbit satellites, SES Networks is able to supply these services with a low-latency (less than 150 ms), scalable satellite-based communications and network services worldwide.

In March 2022, SES reported that the breakdown of revenue to SES Networks by different sectors was as follows:

Innovations 
SES has pioneered many industry technological developments, including DTH transmission, co-location of satellites, free-to-air broadcast neighbourhoods, digital broadcasting, HDTV and 3DTV. SES has also helped develop innovative reception technology such as the first home dish LNBFs, Universal LNBs, optical fibre signal distribution and the Sat-IP system for receiving and distributing satellite signals over home computer networks.

SES has pioneered the broadcast of Ultra High Definition TV (UHDTV) and helped to establish the international technical standards for UHDTV broadcast and reception. SES first produced demonstration UHDTV broadcasts in 2012, transmitted the first HEVC-standard UHDTV in 2013, via Astra 19.2° East, and the first next generation 8K Ultra HD demo in May 2018, via the Astra 3B satellite at 23.5°E. SES broadcast the first live UHDTV satellite broadcast in November 2014 (Linkin Park’s concert at the O2 World in Berlin) and Europe's first free-to-air Ultra HD channel, Pearl TV, launched in September 2015 via Astra 19.2° East A continuous UHDTV demonstration channel has broadcast to Europe from SES's Astra 19.2° East satellite position since 2014 and SES now delivers 12 demo channels via its main orbital positions across the globe. As of 2020, SES was broadcasting over 50 Ultra HD channels worldwide.

SES-8 was the first geostationary satellite to be launched (in 2013) by SpaceX. The SES-10 satellite, was launched in March 2017 (delayed from October 2016 due to a pad explosion and subsequent loss of a Falcon 9 booster in September 2016) on the first SpaceX launch with a 'flight-proven' (reused) Falcon first stage, recovered from a previous launch. The SES-12, SES-14 and SES-15 satellites (launched in June 2018, January 2018 and May 2017, respectively) are constructed with an electric plasma propulsion system for orbit raising and in-orbit manoeuvres to save weight and enable a larger communications payload to be included. SES reckons that SES-12 would weigh some 4700 kg more with a conventional chemical propulsion system.

SES operates the world’s first multi-orbit communications satellite network, combining geostationary orbit satellites’ wide coverage and reliability, and a medium Earth orbit satellite constellation's low latency and high data throughput. In conjunction with Kythera Space Solutions, SES developed Adaptive Resource Control (ARC) software to dynamically control and optimise power, throughput, and beam and frequency allocation across the multi-orbit network of the O3b and forthcoming O3b mPOWER medium Earth orbit satellite system, and SES-17 and future geostationary high-throughput satellites.

SES is the first commercial customer for Space Infrastructure Servicing (SIS) future satellite life extension mission, following an agreement in June 2017 with MacDonald, Dettwiler and Associates (MDA). The SIS craft was being built by Space Systems/Loral (SSL), a manufacturing subsidiary of MDA, for the United States Defense Advanced Research Projects Agency (DARPA)'s Robotic Servicing of Geosynchronous Satellites (RSGS) programme, and will refuel an SES satellite running low on propellant while still in orbit to lengthen its service life.  SSL (as Maxar) abandoned the DARPA contract in 2019.

Corporate structure

Corporate management 
SES is managed by the Senior Leadership Team which comprises:

 Steve Collar – CEO
 John-Paul Hemingway - Chief Strategy and Product Officer
 John Baughn - Chief Services Officer
 Christophe De Hauwer – Chief Development Officer
 Sandeep Jalan - Chief Financial Officer
 Ruy Pinto - Chief Technology Officer
 Pan Macdonald - Chief People Officer
 Thai Rubin - Chief Legal Officer

In 2002, the then CEO, Romain Bausch was awarded 'Satellite Executive of the Year'. Current CEO, Steve Collar was awarded 'Satellite Executive of the Year' for 2019.

History

Early years 
SES was formed on the initiative and support of the Luxembourg Government in 1985 as Société Européenne des Satellites (SES). The Luxembourg State remains a major shareholder. In 1988, as Europe's first private satellite operator, SES launched its first satellite, Astra 1A, to the 19.2° East orbital position. Rupert Murdoch's Sky TV, along with German broadcasters Pro7, Sat.1, and RTL were among Astra's first major customers.

By 1990, Astra was broadcasting to 14 million cable and DTH (Direct to Home) viewers. SES was the pioneer of 'co-location' by which several satellites share the same orbital position to provide mutual backup and increase the number of channels available to a fixed receiving dish, creating what became known as a 'satellite neighbourhood'. Astra's prime slot, 19.2° East, saw as many as eight satellites sharing the position simultaneously and helped to build up Astra's reputation for reliability.

Rapid growth in Germany, in what would become Astra's largest European market, was helped by the German government's decision to liberalize the installation of dishes in 1991. In this time SES became the leading satellite system providing direct-to-home transmission, and became the world's largest satellite platform for TV distribution.

In 1996, after the launch of Astra 1E, SES pioneered digital satellite transmission with the French Canal+. In 1998, SES launched Astra 2A for the UK market, transmitting at the new orbital position 28.2° East, and eventually moving all of its United Kingdom and Ireland transmission capacity to this orbital slot. In the same year, SES went public on the Luxembourg Stock Exchange trading as SESG (in 2005 SES would also list on the Paris Euronext).

Global expansion 
From 1999, SES began a period of ambitious global expansion beyond its European home market. Geographic expansion went hand-in-hand with the diversification of SES' services beyond just TV broadcasting, to cover telecommunication services for businesses, telecommunications companies and government customers, as well as broadband access and technical consultancy services.

In 1999, SES acquired a 34.13% stake in Hong Kong-based satellite operator AsiaSat and took a foothold in Asia and the Pacific region. A year later, SES acquired 50% of Scandinavian satellite broadcaster Nordic Satellite AB (NSAB), later renamed SES Sirius, which strengthened SES' coverage in northern and eastern Europe. The same year, SES also took a participation of 19.99% in Brazilian satellite operator Star One, gaining a first presence in Latin America.

In 2001, SES bought 28.75% of Argentina's Nahuelsat and acquired GE Americom, giving it a solid presence in the important North American market. This resulted in the formation of SES Global, a corporate entity with two operating companies, SES Astra and SES Americom. Altogether, SES operated a fleet of 41 geostationary satellites, the largest in the world in 2001.

Further acquisitions followed. In 2003, SES' stake in NSAB was increased to 75% and in 2005 SES acquired a participation in Canadian satellite operator Ciel and in Mexico's Quetzsat, as well as the divestment from Nahuelsat.

SES acquired services provider, Digital Playout Centre GmbH (later Astra Platform Services, then SES Platform Services, then MX1, now merged into SES) in 2005. and in 2006 SES also acquired ND SatCom, a German provider of government services, developing a services portfolio beyond just bandwidth provision.

Also in 2006, SES acquired New Skies Satellites, later renamed SES New Skies, adding six satellites to the SES fleet and strengthening coverage in Asia, the Middle East and Africa.

In 2007, SES divested from its holdings in AsiaSat and Star One in a complex transaction with General Electric which itself divested from SES.

In 2008, SES increased its stake in NSAB to 90%. and merged its two international operating units, SES Americom and SES New Skies into a new segment which was branded SES World Skies in September 2009.

In 2009, SES and Middle East satellite operator Yahsat announced the formation of a joint venture, YahLive, to commercialise 23 Ku-band transponders on Yahsat 1A, serving the Middle East, North Africa and Western Asia with direct-to-home TV services. Also in 2009, SES announced its investment in O3b Networks a project to build a medium Earth orbit (MEO) satellite constellation to deliver high-speed, low-latency, fibre-like internet broadband trunking to the world's emerging regions ("the Other 3 billion").

In 2010, SES grew its stake in SES Sirius to 100% and closed the acquisition of the in-orbit satellite Protostar-2/Indostar-2, renaming it SES-7 and integrating it into its fleet covering India and Southeast Asia.

In May and September 2011, SES restructured and rebranded the company to streamline the organisation's activities under a single management team and one main brand (SES), incorporating the company's two previous operating entities, SES Astra and SES World Skies.

Global operator 
In August 2011, the Astra 1N satellite was launched to the 28.2° East orbital position, and in September 2011, the QuetzSat 1 satellite was launched to 77.0° West

In February 2012, SES-4 was successfully launched to become SES' 50th satellite and the largest, heaviest and most powerful in the fleet. In July 2012, SES-5, the 51st SES Satellite was launched from Baikonur, Kazakhstan to 5.0° East with 36 Ku-band transponders to provide coverage over Sub-Saharan Africa and the Nordic and the Baltic regions in Europe, and 28 C-band transponders for Europe, Africa and the Middle East.

In September 2012, Astra 2F was successfully launched from Kourou in French Guiana, the first of three "next generation" satellites at the second Astra orbital position at 28.2° East. The satellite has Ku-band coverage of all Europe, the British Isles and sub-Saharan Africa for DTH television, and Ka-band coverage of Central Europe for the SES Broadband satellite internet service.

SES-6 was launched from Baikonur, Kazakhstan on 3 June 2013 to 40.5° East, to replace NSS-806 and provide continuity of service and expansion capacity in C-band for Latin America and the Caribbean. The satellite has 43 C-band and 48 Ku-band transponders with comprehensive coverage of North America, Latin America, Europe and the Atlantic Ocean.

Astra 2E was launched to the Astra 28.2° East position from Baikonur in Kazakhstan on 30 September 2013 to provide free-to-air and encrypted DTH digital TV and satellite broadband services for Europe and the Middle East. The successful launch followed a 10-week delay due to the postponement of all launches by launch services provider ILS after a catastrophic failure of the rocket in a previous launch.

In December 2013, SES-8 was launched from Cape Canaveral using a SpaceX Falcon 9 v1.1, the first geostationary satellite to be launched with a SpaceX rocket.

In March 2014, Astra 5B was launched as SES' 56th satellite to the Astra 31.5° East position from Kourou in French Guiana to provide transponder capacity and extend geographical reach over Central and Eastern Europe, Russia and the Commonwealth of Independent States (CIS) for DTH, direct-to-cable and contribution feeds to digital terrestrial television networks.

In April 2014, Romain Bausch stepped down as president and CEO of SES, a position he had held since 1995 overseeing the growth of the company from a European Direct-to-Home satellite system with four satellites into a global satellite industry leader operating a fleet of more than 50 satellites. Bausch continues to serve SES as a non-executive Director, and is elected to take the role of Chairman at the start of 2015. He was succeeded as CEO by Karim Michel Sabbagh.

In May 2014 SES announced that the engineering services division, SES TechCom had joined with the Luxembourg Government and the Minister for Cooperation and Humanitarian Action, and five Non-governmental organisations (NGO) – Archemed, Fondation Follereau, Friendship, German Doctors and Médecins Sans Frontières to form Satmed, an eHealth platform to improve public health in emerging and developing countries, especially in remote areas with poor connectivity.

In July 2014, SES announced that nearly half of the SES satellite fleet is controlled from the new satellite operations center (SOC) opened at its sales and engineering offices in Princeton, New Jersey. 23 satellites are controlled from Princeton with the remainder operated from SES's global headquarters in Luxembourg.

Astra 2G, the final "next generation" satellite for the 28.2° East orbital position was launched from the Baikonur in December 2014 to deliver broadcast, VSAT and broadband services to Europe, the Middle East and Africa, and to connect West Africa to Europe via Ka-band.

On 13 January 2015, SES announced that it plans to procure and launch a satellite in partnership with the Luxembourg Government, to be called GovSat-1. Jointly owned, the satellite is launched in 2017 to an orbital position above Europe and provide governmental and military communications in the X-band and Ka-band with coverage of Europe, the Middle East, Africa and Asia-Pacific.

In February 2016, it was announced that, subject to regulatory approvals, subsidiary, SES Platform Services would purchase RR Media, a global digital media services provider to the broadcast and media industries, based in Israel. In July 2016, SES announced that the acquisition was complete and that the merged company would be known as MX1.

In March 2016, the SES-9 satellite was successfully launched by a Falcon 9 Full Thrust rocket from Cape Canaveral after four previous attempts on 24 February, 25 February, 28 February, and 1 March 2016 - all aborted due to weather and launcher problems. The satellite used electric propulsion to reach geostationary orbit and will be positioned at 108.2° East to provide 81 Ku-band transponder equivalents for pay-TV, data and mobility across Northeast Asia and South Asia, and Indonesia.

In April 2016, SES announced that (subject to regulatory approvals which are expected to be completed by the end of 2016) it will pay US$20 million to increase its fully diluted ownership of O3b Networks from 49.1% to 50.5%, taking a controlling share in the company. In May 2016, SES said it would raise another US$710 million to purchase 100% of O3b Networks, exercising a call option with O3b minority shareholders and eliminating the possibility of an O3b stock offering, and then subsequently announced the completion of the capital raising and completion of the acquisition.

In May 2016, Modern Times Group, owner of the Viasat DTH platform announced that the Viasat Ultra HD channel would launch in the autumn on the SES-5 satellite at 5.0° East, as the first UHD channel for the Nordic region and the first UHD Sports channel in the World. The channel will feature selected live sport events especially produced in Ultra HD and Viasat will also be launching an Ultra HD set-top box from Samsung and a TV-module to enable existing UHD TVs to display the channel. SES claimed the launch of Viasat Ultra HD will bring the number of UHD channels (including test channels and regional versions) carried on SES satellites to 24, or 46% of all UHD channels broadcast via satellite worldwide.

On 30 March 2017, the SES-10 satellite was successfully launched from Cape Canaveral by a SpaceX Falcon 9 rocket using a refurbished first stage booster that had been previously used to launch a SpaceX Dragon cargo ship to the International Space Station for NASA in April 2016 and then landed and recovered. This is the first time that a rocket booster has been reused in this way. Both the Falcon 9 first stage and the payload fairing were successfully recovered after the SES-10 launch for subsequent reuse. SES-10 is positioned at 67.0° West to serve Latin America.

In April 2017, the Luxembourg Ministry of Foreign and European Affairs extended the contract with SES to maintain, support, and continue to develop the Satmed eHealth platform to improve public health in remote areas of developing countries until 2020, extending the provision of satellite connectivity over Africa, the Philippines and Bangladesh.

In May 2017, SES announced the successful integration with the SES-14 satellite of the NASA Global-scale Observations of the Limb and Disk (GOLD) scientific hosted payload built by the University of Colorado Boulder Laboratory for Atmospheric and Space Physics. The first scientific payload carried by an SES satellite, GOLD was integrated with SES-14 at Airbus Defence and Space in Toulouse, France ahead of its launch to 47.5° West in late 2017 on a SpaceX Falcon 9 Full Thrust from Kennedy Space Center in Cape Canaveral, Florida.

In June 2017, SES announced the start of a 30-month project by the Satellite and Terrestrial Network for 5G (SaT5G) consortium for the seamless, and economically viable, integration of satellite (such as SES' geostationary orbit and medium Earth orbit high throughput satellites) into future 5G networks, improving the ubiquity, resilience and efficiency of 5G services, and opening new markets in media distribution, transport and underserved areas. The consortium is funded by the European Commission under the Horizon 2020 programme and comprises 16 members, including SES and Airbus Defence and Space, Avanti Communications, British Telecom, Broadpeak, Gilat Satellite Networks, OneAccess, Thales Alenia Space, TNO, University of Surrey, and Zodiac Inflight Innovation.

In September 2017, SES announced the next generation of O3b satellites and service. Named O3b mPOWER, the new constellation of (initially) seven MEO satellites built by Boeing Satellite Systems will deliver 10 terabits of capacity globally through 30,000 spot beams for broadband internet services. O3b mPOWER is expected to launch in 2021.

On 11 October 2017, a flight-proven (refurbished) SpaceX Falcon 9 rocket launched the SES-11 satellite to the geostationary orbital position of 105.0° West. The launch was originally set for late 2016 but suffered a year-long delay because of SpaceX's September 2016 Falcon 9 explosion. SES-11 was built by Airbus Defence and Space and is a dual mission satellite, with 24 Ku-band transponders marketed by EchoStar as EchoStar 105 to replace capacity on SES' AMC-15 satellite, and 24 C-band transponders marketed by SES as SES-11 for replacement capacity for AMC-18 delivering video, especially HD and UHD, to the United States, Mexico and the Caribbean. Following positioning at 105.0° West and in-orbit testing, SES-11 was declared fully operational on 29 November 2017.

In February 2018, SES teamed up with Intelsat (later joined by Eutelsat in July 2018) for a proposal to United States Federal Communications Commission (FCC) to form a consortium of satellite service providers to protect the quality and reliability of existing video and audio services to United States households downlinking in the 3700-4200 MHz C-band spectrum while enabling wireless operators to access 100 MHz of C-band spectrum for deployment of next generation 5G services in the United States.

In March 2018, Saint Martin-based satellite TV provider KiwiSAT launched a new DTH platform to deliver about 130 channels (including 90 HD channels) of TV entertainment to consumers across the Caribbean using the SES-10 satellite at 67.0° West.

In May 2018, SES broadcast an 8K television signal via its satellite system for the first time, as part of its Industry Days conference at the Luxembourg HQ. The 8K demonstration content, with a resolution of 7680 x 4320 pixels, a frame rate of 60 frames per second and 10-bit colour depth, was encoded in HEVC and transmitted at a rate of 80 Mbit/s via the Astra 3B satellite.

In September 2018, in response to a Notice of Proposed Rulemaking of July 2018 from the United States Federal Communications Commission (FCC) to make the 3.7 to 4.2 GHz spectrum available for next-generation terrestrial fixed and mobile broadband services, SES, along with Intelsat, Eutelsat and Telesat - together providing the majority of C-band satellite services in the United States, including media distribution reaching 100 million United States households - established the C-Band Alliance (CBA). The consortium's proposal to the FCC is to act as a facilitator for the clearing and repurposing of a 200 MHz portion of C-band spectrum to accelerate the deployment of next generation 5G services while protecting incumbent users and their content distribution and data networks in the US from potential interference.

In April 2019, four O3b medium Earth orbit (MEO) satellites were launched by Arianespace at the Centre Spatial Guyanais in Kourou, French Guiana to complete the constellation of 20 first generation satellites for the SES-owned network communications service provider.

In May 2019, for the first time in Europe, 8K demonstration content was received via satellite without the need for a separate external receiver or decoder. At the 2019, SES Industry Days conference at Betzdorf, Luxembourg broadcast quality 8K content (with a resolution of 7680 x 4320 pixels at 50 frames/s) was encoded using a Spin Digital HEVC encoder (at a bit rate of 70 Mbit/s), uplinked to a single 33 MHz transponder on SES' Astra 28.2°E satellites and the downlink received and displayed on a Samsung 82in Q950RB production model TV.

In September 2019, SES announced it had partnered with satellite payload and network management systems developer, Kythera Space Solutions to develop the ARC (Adaptive Resource Control) software to enable the dynamic control and optimisation of power, throughput, beams and frequency allocation on O3b mPOWER, SES-17 and other future high-throughput satellites and their networks, autonomously optimizing space and ground resources, on-the-fly, in accordance with customers' changing needs.

In September 2019, SES became a Microsoft Azure ExpressRoute services partner to provide dedicated, private network connectivity from sea vessels, aircraft, and industrial or government sites anywhere in the world to the Azure cloud computing service, via both its geostationary and O3b medium Earth orbit satellites.

In September 2019, SES announced a new Free-to-view DTH platform on Astra 1N at 19.2° East, encrypted using Verimatrix and carrying 30-40 channels from Russian-language OTT broadcaster Kartina TV for Russian-speaking diaspora across Europe with limited broadband connectivity.

In September 2019, the media technical services provider MX1, a wholly owned subsidiary of SES, was merged into the SES Video division, dropping the MX1 brand and providing all broadcast and streamed content management, playout, distribution, and monetisation services under the SES name.

In May 2020, SES released the results of the 2019 Satellite Monitor TV reception survey, which for the first time covered the Philippines. The survey found satellite TV is the second-most popular mode of TV reception in the Philippines with 17% of over 20.8 million TV households, behind terrestrial TV (66%), and that broadcasts from SES satellites reach 98% of Filipino satellite TV households.

On 26 May 2020, SES elected to clear a portion of the C-Band spectrum in the United States, currently used for satellite TV services, in accordance with the Federal Communications Commission (FCC) order for the accelerated release of the 3.7-4.0 GHz portion of the band for 5G mobile broadband services. The SES Board of Directors approved US$1.6 billion for the procurement and launch of new satellites and other equipment and services for the migration of existing customers using the spectrum, which will be reimbursable through the FCC Clearinghouse. In June 2020, SES announced that four new C-band satellites had been ordered for this purpose from United States manufacturers, Boeing and Northrop Grumman. SES-18 and SES-19 will be GEOStar-3 satellites designed, assembled, and tested by Northrop Grumman, and SES-20 and SES-21 will be all-electric 702SP satellites from Boeing. Each satellite will have ten 36 MHz C-band transponders for delivery of digital TV and data services, and will be launched in 2022 to orbital slots at 103.0° West, 131.0° West and 135.0° West.

In July 2020, SES launched a free-to-air information channel, Fight COVID-19, across several satellites to combat the global coronavirus pandemic. Available to millions of households across Africa, Europe, and Asia-Pacific, and providing underserved and rural communities with critical information about how to limit the spread of the virus, the content is provided by trusted organisations such as UNICEF, AFP and other international and regional organisations. The channel is broadcast from SES-5 (5.0° East) for Sub-Saharan Africa, Astra 4A (5.0° East) for Europe and Ukraine, Astra 2F (28.2° East) for West Africa, NSS-12 (57.0° East) for Ethiopia and adjacent countries, and SES-9 (108.2° East) for the Philippines.

In August 2020, SES ordered two C-Band geostationary TV satellites from Thales Alenia Space. SES-22 and SES-23 are the last of six satellites SES needs to relocate existing C-band services from a portion of the C-band spectrum in accordance with the Federal Communications Commission's plans to repurpose the frequencies for 5G cellular networks.

In August 2020 SES contracted Boeing to build four O3b mPOWER satellites in addition to the seven already under construction. SpaceX was contracted for an additional two launches, to make four launches for the whole O3b mPOWER constellation in 2021–2024.

In September 2020, SES and Microsoft announced that SES was the medium Earth orbit connectivity partner for the Microsoft Azure Orbital ground station service that enables network operators to control their satellite operations and capacity from within the Azure cloud computing service. Under their agreement, SES and Microsoft will jointly invest in Azure Orbital ground stations for the MEO and Earth Observation segments, initially in the US, which will be installed and managed by SES. Also, satellite telemetry, tracking and control systems and data ground stations for the forthcoming O3b mPOWER satellites will be located with Microsoft's Azure edge sites to provide O3b mPOWER customers with ‘one-hop’ access to Azure cloud services.

In February 2021, SES agreed multi-year extension capacity contracts worth over €66 million with European public service broadcasters including ARD, BBC, BVN, France 24, TV5Monde and ZDF

In March 2021, the Luxembourg government further extended the contract with SES to provide the Satmed satellite eHealth platform to improve public health in remote areas of developing countries until 2024, with a €6.5 billion budget and plans for additional functionalities and deployments, and new partnerships with both more NGOs and supranational organisations to provide regional or cross-country support.

In June 2021, SES joined the Amazon Web Services Direct Connect Delivery Partner programme, to provide customers access to AWS cloud-based applications and services from locations around the world with limited or no terrestrial communications, claiming to be the first satellite operator to do so. The service is provided via SES' geostationary satellites and the O3b medium Earth orbit satellites and also gives cloud providers a backup network if their infrastructure fails.

In July 2021, SES entered into a capacity agreement with Indian public sector enterprise, NewSpace India Limited (NSIL) for 9 transponders on the SES-8 satellite at 95°E, for distribution of satellite TV services across India and the thriving direct-to-home market.

In August 2021, Microsoft became the first cloud computing provider customer for SES' O3b medium Earth orbit satellite system, with Microsoft buying managed satellite connectivity services from SES for the Microsoft Azure cloud service. Microsoft is initially using the existing first generation O3b satellites, before upgrading to the faster broadband speeds from the forthcoming O3b mPOWER satellites when they come into operation in 2022.

In September 2021, the wholly-owned direct-to-consumer HD service in Germany, HD+ launched the HD+ ToGo app for Android and iOS smartphones and tablets giving existing subscribers access to the platform's 50 HD channels, along with catch-up services and online functions, on mobile devices for an additional fee.

In October 2021, the SES-17 satellite was launched from the Guiana Space Centre in Kourou, French Guiana, SES's first geostationary Ka-band high-throughput satellite. SES-17 has an all-electric propulsion system and will reach its 67.1°W position in geostationary orbit in mid-2022, providing coverage for aeronautical, maritime, enterprise, and government markets across the Americas, the Caribbean and the Atlantic Ocean. It has a fully digital payload with nearly 200 reprogrammable spot beams that can be freely interconnected and changed in power and frequency in real-time to adapt to changing customer demands, and will operate in conjunction with SES's forthcoming O3b mPOWER medium Earth orbit satellites as a multi-orbit system.

In November 2021, SES ordered two replacement satellites from Thales Alenia Space for launch in 2024 to SES's original orbital position at 19.2°E and service well into the 2040s. Like the satellites currently at the Astra 19.2°E slot (Astra 1KR, Astra 1L, Astra 1M, and Astra 1N - all launched 10–15 years ago, with the older two at the end of their planned life), Astra 1P will provide direct-to-home broadcast TV to Europe, in particular Germany, France and Spain. Astra 1Q is a reconfigurable software defined satellite with both wide beams for broadcast TV and high-throughput spot beams for video and data customers.

In November 2021, SES announced that wholly owned subsidiary HD+, the premium HD and UHD satellite TV service for German users, would start a new service, HD+ IP, in December 2021 to stream HD+ channels to viewers' TV sets through a smart TV app without the need for a dish or set-top box, for a subscription of €6 per month.

In December 2021, SES's wholly owned subsidiary SES Government Solutions (now SES Space & Defense) announced that the US Army has conducted trials of commercial satellite constellations in multiple orbits, including SES's O3b medium Earth orbit satellites, as part of the effort to establish Multi-Domain Operations.

In December 2021, Honeywell, Hughes Network Systems and SES demonstrated multi-orbit high-speed airborne connectivity for military customers using Honeywell's JetWave MCX terminal and a Hughes HM-series modem, and SES satellites in both medium Earth orbit (MEO) and geostationary orbit (GEO). The tests achieved full duplex data rates of more than 40 megabits per second via a number of SES' (GEO) satellites including GovSat-1, and the high-throughput, low-latency O3b MEO satellite constellation, with connections moving between GEO/MEO links in under 30 sec.

Recent Events 
In February 2022, SES formed a joint venture with India's biggest telco, Jio Platforms (JPL). The newly formed Jio Space Technology Limited will deliver broadband services in India of up to 100Gbit/s capacity, using the SES-12 high-throughput geostationary satellite and the forthcoming O3b mPOWER medium Earth orbit satellite constellation, to extend JPL's terrestrial network, enhancing access to digital services in unconnected areas within India and the region. JPL and SES will own 51% and 49% equity stake respectively in the new company.

In February 2022, Orange announced that, along with SES, it will deploy and manage the first gateway in Africa for SES's forthcoming O3b mPOWER medium Earth orbit satellite constellation, to provide high-speed, low-latency, and cloud-optimised connectivity services across Africa, and to support telemetry, tracking and command functions for the satellites. The gateway will be located at the Sonatel teleport in Gandoul, Senegal.

In March 2022, SES announced a deal with mobile operator, Verizon to speed up deployment of 5G services in the US. Under the agreement, SES will install filters and other equipment to Earth Stations across the entire country, to give Verizon access to the 3.7-3.8 GHz C-band spectrum in key regions ahead of the deadlines for relocation of existing satellite services set out in the FCC's order to make part of the C-Band spectrum available for 5G terrestrial fixed and mobile broadband services.

In March 2022, SES announced the agreement to acquire DRS Global Enterprise Solutions (GES), a US-based subsidiary of defence contractor, Leonardo DRS for US$450 million. GES provides managed satcom services to the US Defence Department and other government agencies, and when the transaction is concluded (expected towards the end of 2022 after regulatory approvals) the business will be combined with SES subsidiary, SES Government Solutions (now SES Space & Defense), doubling its revenue from the US government and further expanding market access for SES's next-generation Medium Earth orbit network, O3b mPOWER, which will begin operation at that time.

In March 2022, SES extended the November 2021 order for two satellites from Thales Alenia Space with a third satellite, SES-26. With both Ku-band and C-band transponders, the reconfigurable software-defined satellite will replace NSS-12 at 57°E, providing content delivery and connectivity across Europe, Africa, the Middle East, and Asia-Pacific.

In May 2022, SES subsidiary, SES Government Solutions (now SES Space & Defense), in partnership with Earth imaging company, Planet Labs PBC, was awarded a US$28.96 million contract from NASA's Communications Services Project for real-time, always-on low-latency connectivity services to NASA spacecraft, using SES's geostationary orbiting C-band satellites and medium Earth orbiting Ka-band satellites, including the forthcoming O3b mPOWER constellation.

In May 2022, in conjunction with Kazakhstani mobile network operator, Kcell, SES used the O3b satellite constellation to demonstrate that medium Earth orbit satellites could be used to provide high-speed 3G and 4G connectivity to remote regions of Kazakhstan for reliable video calling, conferencing and streaming, and web browsing, with a latency five times lower than on the existing platform based on geostationary orbit satellites.

In June 2022, the SES-22 satellite was successfully launched from the Cape Canaveral Space Force Station by a SpaceX Falcon 9 Block 5 rocket. SES-22 will operate at 135° W, and is the first to launch of SES's six geostationary C-band satellites (SES-18, SES-19, SES-20, SES-21, SES-22, and SES-23) that will enable existing TV and radio services to be moved from the lower 300 MHz of the C-band spectrum to the upper 200 MHz, as part of the Federal Communications Commission (FCC) programme to make room for the deployment of 5G services across the US.

In August 2022, SES completed the US$450 million acquisition of DRS Global Enterprise Solutions (GES) from US defence contractor, Leonardo DRS, after obtaining the necessary regulatory approvals. The business will be combined with SES subsidiary, SES Government Solutions (now SES Space & Defense) to create a “scaled solutions provider serving the multi-orbit satellite communications needs of the US Government” and SES’s largest data business segment by revenue.

In October 2022, the SES-20 and SES-21 satellites were successfully launched on an Atlas V rocket from Cape Canaveral. The two Boeing-built C-band satellites are part of SES’s programme to clear part of the C-band spectrum for 5G services. SES-20 and SES-21 will be positioned at 103° West and 131° West, respectively, to provide a continued service of TV and radio broadcasts to the US. The satellites were expected to begin operations in November 2022. SES-21 became operational at 131° West on 1 December 2022. SES-20 arrived at the 103° West orbital slot on 5 January 2023 where it will serve as an in-orbit spare satellite in case of failure of other SES satellites used in the C-band clearance programme.

In October 2022, SES announced that it had launched a content distribution platform dedicated to sports and events, providing coverage over Europe, the Middle East and North Africa, for customers including broadcasters, professional sports leagues, national and international sports associations, and sports rights holders.

In December 2022, following the acquisition of DRS Global Enterprise Solutions in August 2022, and its merger into SES Government Solutions, the combined subsidiary company was renamed SES Space & Defense, and restructured into two business units, Space Initiatives (using SES's multi-orbit satellite fleet and infrastructure) and Defense Networks (providing multi-operator managed services and end-to-end mission communications).

On 16 December 2022, the first two O3b mPOWER satellites were successfully launched from Cape Canaveral Space Force Station in Florida at 5:48 pm local time. It is expected to take approximately six months for each satellite to reach its designated medium Earth orbit and for commissioning, and the O3b mPower service to start in Q3 2023.

In January 2023, SES announced an agreement with High View, the Munich-based owner of the Deluxe Music channel, to lease additional capacity on the Astra 19.2°E satellites for four new music channels, Deluxe Dance by Kontor, Deluxe Flashback, Deluxe Rock and Deluxe Rap. Aimed at German-speaking viewers in Germany, Austria, and Switzerland, the new channels started on 1 February 2023 and broadcast free-to-air. In February, High View announced that its  streamed travel and documentary channels, Xplore, Hip Trips and One Terra will also broadcast free-to-air via Astra 19.2°E from 1 March 1 2023.

On 26 January 2023, the Astra 2D satellite was decommissioned and retired to a graveyard orbit more than 22 years after its launch in December 2000. Astra 2D was built for SES by Hughes Space and Communications (now Boeing Satellite Development Center) with a design life of 15 years providing direct-to-home digital TV distribution from the Astra 28.2°E orbital position. It was the last commercial spin-stabilised spacecraft built by Hughes and, at the time of its retirement, the only one still in operation.

In February 2023, SES notified the Federal Communications Commission (FCC) that the deployment plan for the SES-18 and SES-19 satellites (to be launched as part of the C-band clearance programme) had been revised from the FCC licence granted in March 2022. SES-18 would now be positioned at 103°W (previously to be deployed at 131°W) and SES-19 will be at 135°W (previously 103°W).

Satellite fleet 

The following active satellites are owned and operated by SES, .

Future satellite launches

Hosted payloads 
SES is active in the hosted payload market, selling space on planned and under-construction satellites to governments and institutions. SES-2 (launched September 2011) carries the US Air Force's Commercially Hosted Infrared Payload (CHIRP), a wide field-of-view, passive infrared sensor to provide early warning of missile launches, the first time a US Air Force payload has been hosted on a commercial mission.

The SES-5 and Astra 5B satellites (launched July 2012 and March 2014, respectively) incorporate European Geostationary Navigation Overlay Service (EGNOS) payloads, a supplementary network to the Global Positioning System (GPS) and GLONASS navigation systems.

SES-15 (launched May 2017) includes the Federal Aviation Administration (FAA) Wide Area Augmentation System (WAAS) air navigation aid to augment the Global Positioning System (GPS), with the goal of improving its accuracy, integrity and availability.

SES-14 (launched January 2018) hosts the Global-scale Observations of the Limb and Disk (GOLD) mission for NASA to investigate the Sun's impact on the Earth's thermosphere and ionosphere.

Teleports 
SES, and its subsidiary companies has teleports across the world, including:

SES Space & Defense (previously SES Government Solutions) operates Earth stations at the following United States Government locations:

See also 

 Astra satellite family
 HD+
O3b
O3b mPOWER
 Companies now merged into SES
 MX1
 O3b Networks
 SES Americom
 SES Platform Services
 SES Sirius
 SES World Skies

References

External links

SES fleet information and map
SpaceX Falcon 9 SES-9 Mission Briefing, Martin Halliwell, Chief Technology Officer, 23 February 2016. Includes strategic and technical outlook.

 
Telecommunications companies of Luxembourg
Direct broadcast satellite services
Betzdorf, Luxembourg
Telecommunications companies established in 2001
Communications satellite operators
2001 establishments in Luxembourg
Multinational companies headquartered in Luxembourg
Companies listed on the Luxembourg Stock Exchange
Companies listed on Euronext Paris